Seeham is a municipality in the district of Salzburg-Umgebung in the state of Salzburg in Austria.

Geography
Seeham lies in the Flachgau on the west bank of the Obertrumer Lake.

References

Cities and towns in Salzburg-Umgebung District